Bart Baxter is an American poet living in London, UK.  He has been published in ERGO! (a paperback anthology of work by Bumbershoot writers), Seattle Review, Red Cedar Review, The Ohio Poetry Review and Raven Chronicles. The Washington Poets Association created the Bart Baxter Award in 1998 which "recognizes poetry on the stage, not just on the page." Baxter was on the board of Red Sky Poetry Theatre for three years from 1989 - 1991.

Books
A Man, Ostensibly, Egress Studio Press, 2004
 The Man with St. Vitus' Dance, Floating Bridge Press, Seattle, 2000 (includes CD with QuickTime video of Bart performing title poem)
 Sonnets from the Mare Imbrium, Floating Bridge Press, Seattle, 1999
 Peace for the Arsonist, Bacchae Press, Bristolville, Ohio, 1995
 Driving Wrong, Poetry Around Press, Seattle, 1992.

Awards
 1994 Hart Crane Award (Kent State University)
 1994 MTV Poetry Grand Slam
 1995 Charles Proctor Award (Washington State)
 1996 Carlin Aden Award
 1997 William Stafford Award
 1998 Seattle Poetry Grand Slam

References

External links
on Bart baxter
his awards.

Poets from Washington (state)
Living people
Year of birth missing (living people)